Anton Celebi (Çelebi, Chelebi, Antoine Cheleby) was a wealthy Armenian silk merchant in Ottoman Empire during the second quarter of the 17th-century with offices in Smyrna (now İzmir) and Constantinople (now Istanbul). He was the Governor of Bursa and the tax collector of Izmir sometime around mid-1600s, who at some point had to flee to Livorno because of being threatened to be killed by the Sultan.

After arriving in Livorno, he opened a Turkish bath, owned six ships, sailing between Izmir or Alesandretta and Livorno twice a year. According to Fratarellis's article on Armenians in Livorno, Çelebi was a very important shipowner in the small Tuscan fleet.

Anton Celebi was the governor of Bursa in the 1650s when the famous Venetian traveler Niccolao Manucci passed through the city on his way to Mughal Empire and was entertained by Celebi in his “country house.” Celebi, sensing that his life and fortunes were endangered in the Ottoman Empire, had taken steps to transfer his wealth to Livorno and fled there during Manucci's visit.

He was a member of the wealthy Armenian Chelebies family.

References

Sources

External links
The Extremely Remarkable Story of Hasan Agha and His Brother Anton Chelebi

17th-century Armenian people
Governors of Bursa